John Thomson (1521–1597), of Husborne Crawley, Bedfordshire, and Aldersgate, London, was an English politician.

He was a Member (MP) of the Parliament of England for New Windsor in 1571 and Bedfordshire in 1572.

References

1521 births
1597 deaths
People from Central Bedfordshire District
English MPs 1571
English MPs 1572–1583